Pyigyidagun Township (also spelled Pyigyitagun Township) is located in the southern part of Mandalay, Myanmar. The township is bounded by Chanmyathazi Township in the north and the west, and Amarapura in the south.

References

Townships of Mandalay
Townships of Mandalay Region
Mandalay